The 2010 season was the Royal Thai Army's 1st season back in the top division of Thai football after promotion from the 1st division. This article shows statistics of the club's players in the season, and also lists all matches that the club played in the season.

Team kit

Chronological list of events
10 November 2009: The Thai Premier League 2010 season first leg fixtures were announced.
6 October 2010: Royal Thai Army were knocked out of the Thai League Cup by Nong Khai in the second round.
13 October 2010: Royal Thai Army were relegated from the Thai Premier League on their 1st season back.
24 October 2010: Royal Thai Army finished in 20th place in the Thai Premier League.

Current squad

Results

Thai Premier League

League table

FA Cup

Third round

Fourth round

Quarter-final

League Cup

First round

1st Leg

2nd Leg

Second round

1st Leg

2nd Leg

Queen's Cup

References

2010
Royal Thai Army